Homashahr is a city and capital of Homaijan District, in Sepidan County, Fars Province, Iran.  It was formed in 2010 from an amalgamation of the villages of Deh Bid, Dehpagah, Damqanat, Qaleh-ye Abbasabad, and Qaleh-ye Tiskhani. As of the 2006 census, the city (the combination of the amalgamated villages) had a population of 2,385, in 549 families.

References

Populated places in Sepidan County

Cities in Fars Province
2010 establishments in Iran